Horacio Barrionuevo (born 6 June 1939) is an Argentine former football defender.

References

External links
 Horacio Barrionuevo at BDFA.com.ar 

1939 births
Living people
Argentine footballers
Argentine expatriate footballers
Association football defenders
Central Córdoba de Rosario footballers
Club Atlético Tigre footballers
Club Atlético Vélez Sarsfield footballers
Argentinos Juniors footballers
OGC Nice players
Expatriate footballers in France
Ligue 1 players
Argentine Primera División players
Argentine expatriate sportspeople in France
People from Junín, Buenos Aires
Sportspeople from Buenos Aires Province